Euonymus europaeus, the spindle, European spindle, or common spindle, is a species of flowering plant in the family Celastraceae, native to much of Europe, where it inhabits the edges of forest, hedges and gentle slopes, tending to thrive on nutrient-rich, chalky and salt-poor soils. It is a deciduous shrub or small tree.

Description
The leaves are opposite, lanceolate to elliptical, 3–8 cm long and 1–3 cm broad, with a finely serrated edge. Leaves are dark green in summer. Autumn colour ranges from yellow-green to reddish-purple, depending on environmental conditions.

The hermaphrodite flowers are produced in late spring and are insect-pollinated; they are rather inconspicuous, small, yellowish green and grow in cymes of 3–8 together. The capsular fruit ripens in autumn, and is red to purple or pink in colour and approximately 1–1.5 cm wide. When ripe, the four lobes split open to reveal the orange seeds.

Habitat and ecology

E. europaeus occurs as an understory shrub or small tree primarily in old hedgerows, open woodland clearings and margins, and scrubland on base-rich or calcareous soils, although it is also shade-tolerant. It rarely invades open habitats such as grasslands except in the presence of abundant hedges In Ireland, it can also be found growing on rocky limestone outcrops, rocky lake shores and limestone pavements.

It is typical in Fraxinus excelsior – Acer campestre – Mercurialis perennis woodland (W8), and it is a frequent companion of Cornus sanguinea in open-stand scrub over limestone, generally in low frequency and abundance throughout. It is usually scattered in distribution but may occasionally occur remarkably commonly on a local scale, such as in the so-called ‘’Spindle Valley’’ in the Chilterns. The scattered distribution is likely limited by dispersal of seeds via birds and rodents.

E. europaeus is the almost exclusive winter host of the black bean aphid. Because of the potential economic loss from this insect that feeds on cultivated broad beans and sugar beet, spindle in the past was commonly removed from hedges and woodlands as a measure against black bean aphid outbreaks and agricultural yield losses, although this widespread removal does not appear to have impacted current populations. In 1944, The Biology War Committee also began a campaign to investigate the distribution and ecology of E. europeaus as a basis for aphid control measures.

Cultivation and uses
 
It is a popular ornamental plant in gardens and parks due to its bright pink or purple fruits and attractive autumn colouring.

In cultivation in the UK, the cultivar 'Red Cascade' has gained the Royal Horticultural Society's Award of Garden Merit.

European spindle wood is very hard, and can be cut to a sharp point; it was used in the past for making spindles for wool-spinning and for butchers' skewers.

Charcoal produced from this plant is seen as superior among artists due to its strength and density.

Parts of the plant have been used medicinally. However, the fruit is poisonous, containing, amongst other substances, the alkaloids theobromine and caffeine, as well as a large number of much more toxic substances and an extremely bitter terpene. Poisonings are more common in young children, who are enticed by the brightly coloured fruits. Ingestion can result in liver and kidney damage and even death.

Synonyms
Euonymus multiflorus   Opiz ex Bercht.   [1838]
Euonymus floribundus Steven [1856]
Euonymus europaeus var. macrophyllus Rchb.
Euonymus europaeus var. intermedius Gaudin
Euonymus bulgaricus Velen. [1891]
Euonymus vulgaris Mill. [1768]
Euonymus angustifolius Clairv.

Gallery

References

External links

europaeus
Flora of Europe
Flora of Ukraine
Plants described in 1753
Taxa named by Carl Linnaeus